Dmitry Viktorovich Kochnev (born 1 March 1964, Moscow, Soviet Union) is a Russian army general. From June 2015 to May 2016, he was the head of the Russian Presidential Security Service and as acting head from June to December 2015. Since 26 May 2016, he has been the Director of the Federal Protective Service. He was promoted to the rank of army general in early June 2021.

References

Military personnel from Moscow
1964 births
Living people
Recipients of the Order of Courage
Generals of the army (Russia)